Static Peak is located in the Teton Range, Grand Teton National Park, in the U.S. state of Wyoming. Below the summit on the north face, a small remnant glacier persists, sheltered from direct sunlight by steep cliffs. Timberline Lake lies to the north of the peak.

References

Mountains of Grand Teton National Park
Mountains of Wyoming
Mountains of Teton County, Wyoming